Colin White may refer to:
Colin White (cricketer) (1937–2012), English cricketer
Colin White (historian) (1951–2008), British naval historian
Colin White (ice hockey, born 1977), Canadian ice hockey defenceman
Colin White (ice hockey, born 1997), American ice hockey center
Colin White (racing driver) (born 1956), British racing driver